Boule de Suif (released in English-speaking countries as Angel and Sinner) is a 1945 French historical drama film directed by Christian-Jaque and starring Micheline Presle, Berthe Bovy and Louise Conte. It is an adaptation of the short story Boule de suif by Guy de Maupassant, set during the Franco-Prussian War.

Cast
 Micheline Presle : Élisabeth Rousset
 Louis Salou : Le lieutenant prussien "Fifi"
 Berthe Bovy : Mme Bonnet
 Alfred Adam : Cornudet
 Jean Brochard : Auguste Loiseau
 Suzet Maïs : Mme Loiseau
 Marcel Simon : Le comte Hubert de Bréville
 Louise Conte : La comtesse de Bréville
 Pierre Palau : Edmond Carré-Lamadon
 Janine Viénot : Mme Carré-Lamadon
 Jean Sinoël : Mr Follenvie, l'aubergiste
 Gabrielle Fontan : Mme Follenvie
 Berthe Tissen : La fille franc-tireur 
 Mona Dol : La sœur
 Roger Karl : Le major-Colonel
 Jim Gérald : Le capitaine Von Kerfenstein
 Michel Salina : L'officier musicien
 Denis d'Inès : Le curé d'Uville
 Georges Tourreil : Le chef des francs-tireurs
 Marcel Mouloudji : Un franc-tireur
 Pierre Duncan : Un franc-tireur
 Nicolas Bataille : Un franc-tireur
 Albert Malbert : Le cocher
 Paul Faivre : Poitevin
 Robert Dalban : Oskar
 Howard Vernon : Un Prussien
 Marcel Rouzé : Le domestique de M. Poitevin
 Jean Werner : Un Prussien

Reception
It was one of the most popular films of the year in France in 1945.

References

External links

1940s historical drama films
1945 films
French historical drama films
1940s French-language films
Films directed by Christian-Jaque
Films based on Boule de Suif
Franco-Prussian War films
French black-and-white films
1945 drama films
1940s French films